Dan Pedoe may refer to:

 Daniel Pedoe (1910–1998), English-born mathematician and geometer
 Dan Tunstall Pedoe (1939–2015), cardiologist